Lasantha is a given name. Notable people with the name include:

Lasantha Alagiyawanna (born 1967), Sri Lankan politician
Lasantha Rodrigo (born 1938), Sri Lankan cricketer
Lasantha Wickrematunge (1958–2009), Sri Lankan journalist, politician, and human rights activist

Sinhalese masculine given names